William Wall may refer to:

William Wall (theologian) (1647–1728), British priest in the Church of England who wrote extensively on the doctrine of infant baptism
William Guy Wall (1792–1864), American painter of Irish birth
William Wall (New York politician) (1800–1872), U.S. Representative from New York
William Wall (Australian politician) (1845–1926), member of the New South Wales Legislative Assembly
William Michael Wall (1911–1962), Canadian politician
William Wall (Wisconsin politician) (1836–1884), member of the Wisconsin State Assembly
Willie Wall (hurler) (1912–2004), Irish hurler during the late 1930s
William Wall (writer) (born 1955), Irish novelist, poet and short story writer
William Wall (cricketer) (1854–1922), English cricketer
William Madison Wall (1821–1869), Mormon pioneer, explorer and church leader
William Archibald Wall (1828–1878), American painter

See also
William Walls (disambiguation)